Theodore Leo Fritsch (October 31, 1920 – October 4, 1979) was an American baseball, basketball, and football player who played running back for the National Football League's Green Bay Packers from 1942 to 1950. He also played two seasons for the Oshkosh All-Stars of the National Basketball League.  Fritsch also played as an outfielder for the Portsmouth Cubs, Nashville Vols, and Los Angeles Angels minor league baseball teams in 1944. He attended Spencer High School in Spencer, WI and the High School's football field was named after him. Notre Dame High School in Green Bay is also named after him. Fritsch died in 1979 of a heart attack

His son, Ted Fritsch, Jr., also played in the NFL in the 1970s.

References

External links

1920 births
1979 deaths
American men's basketball players
American football running backs
Green Bay Packers players
Los Angeles Angels (minor league) players
Nashville Vols players
Oshkosh All-Stars players
People from Spencer, Wisconsin
Players of American football from Wisconsin
Baseball players from Wisconsin
Basketball players from Wisconsin
Portsmouth Cubs players
Wisconsin–Stevens Point Pointers baseball players
Wisconsin–Stevens Point Pointers football players
Wisconsin–Stevens Point Pointers men's basketball players